Febri Hariyadi (born 19 February 1996) is an Indonesian professional footballer who plays as a winger for Liga 1 club Persib Bandung.

Club career

Persib Bandung 
Febri Haryadi started his professional career at Persib Bandung in 2016. He made his debut with Persib Bandung on 30 April 2016, against Sriwijaya FC in 2016 Indonesia Soccer Championship A. He signed in during the 78th minute to substitute Samsul Arif.

International career 
He made his international debut on 21 March 2017, against Myanmar.

Career Statistics

Club

International

International under-23 goals

Style of Play 
Febri Haryadi is known by his speed, pace and great dribbling ability. Many people in Indonesia dubbed him as The next Eka Ramdani.

Honours

International 
Indonesia U-23
 Southeast Asian Games  Bronze medal: 2017
Indonesia
 Aceh World Solidarity Cup runner-up: 2017

Individual 
Persib Bandung
 President Cup Best Young Player: 2017
 Liga 1 Team of the Season: 2019 (Substitutes)
Persib Bandung Goal of the Year 2021–22'''

References

External links 
 
 

1996 births
Living people
Sundanese people
People from Bandung
Sportspeople from Bandung
Sportspeople from West Java
Indonesian footballers
Persib Bandung players
Liga 1 (Indonesia) players
Indonesia youth international footballers
Indonesia international footballers
Association football midfielders
Southeast Asian Games bronze medalists for Indonesia
Southeast Asian Games medalists in football
Footballers at the 2018 Asian Games
Competitors at the 2017 Southeast Asian Games
Asian Games competitors for Indonesia